Joseph Henry Lake (January 6, 1881 – June 30, 1950) was a pitcher in Major League Baseball from 1908 to 1913. He played for the New York Highlanders, St. Louis Browns, and Detroit Tigers. Lake made his major league debut on April 21, 1908; his final game was five years later on August 25, 1913. Lake's key pitches were the spitball and the fastball.

References

External links

1881 births
1950 deaths
Major League Baseball pitchers
New York Highlanders players
St. Louis Browns players
Detroit Tigers players
Baseball players from New York (state)
Sportspeople from Brooklyn
Baseball players from New York City
Newburgh Hill Climbers players
Jersey City Skeeters players
Minneapolis Millers (baseball) players
Peekskill Highlanders players
Burials at St. John's Cemetery (Queens)